Bom Sucesso is a municipality in the Brazilian state of Minas Gerais.

References

Populated places established in 1736
Municipalities in Minas Gerais